The Air Secretary and Chief of Staff, Personnel is the Royal Air Force officer with responsibility for appointments, promotions, postings, and discipline of high ranking members of the British air force. From 1978 to 1983 the Air Secretary was more often referred to as "Air Officer Commanding Royal Air Force Personnel Management Centre". It is a senior RAF appointment, held by an officer holding the rank of air vice-marshal and appointed by the sovereign. The Air Secretary's counterpart in the British Army is the Military Secretary and the Royal Navy equivalent is the Naval Secretary.

Air secretaries
The following officers have held the post:
4 February 1957 Air Marshal Sir Denis Barnett
1 May 1959 Air Chief Marshal Sir Theodore McEvoy
22 October 1962 Air Chief Marshal Sir William MacDonald
14 July 1966 Air Marshal Sir Donald Evans
7 December 1967 Air Chief Marshal Sir Brian Burnett
27 March 1970 Air Marshal Sir Gareth Clayton
31 March 1972 Air Marshal Sir John Barraclough
15 October 1973 Air Chief Marshal Sir Derek Hodgkinson
28 February 1976 Air Marshal Sir Neville Stack
1978 – 1983, post vacant
1983 Air Vice-Marshal J B Duxbury
December 1985 Air Vice-Marshal Tony Mason
10 February 1989 Air Vice-Marshal Robert Honey
March 1994 Air Vice Marshal Robert O'Brien
August 1998 Air Vice Marshal Ian Michael Stewart
2003 Air Vice-Marshal Graham Miller
July 2004 Air Vice-Marshal Peter Ruddock
22 May 2006 Air Vice-Marshal S Bryant
27 March 2009 Air Vice-Marshal Michael Lloyd
September 2011 Air Vice-Marshal Matthew Wiles
2013–2016 Air Vice-Marshal David Stubbs
July 2016 – February 2020: Air Vice-Marshal Chris Elliot
February 2020 – Present: Air Vice-Marshal Maria Byford

See also
Air Council
Air Force Board

References

Royal Air Force appointments